Name the Woman may refer to:

 Name the Woman (1928 film), an American silent film directed by Erle C. Kenton
 Name the Woman (1934 film), an American film directed by  Albert S. Rogell